Emily Hope Schulman (born August 17, 1977) is an American former child actress and commercial agent, and current acting instructor. She is known for her role as next-door neighbor Harriet Brindle on the sitcom Small Wonder, which ran from 1985 to 1989.

Career
By age six, Schulman had appeared in over 200 TV commercials. In 1984, she was then cast in the role of Harriet on the pilot for Small Wonder, which ran for four seasons and 96 episodes. Schulman's childhood work, though often later lampooned for its perceived kitsch, received recognition by her contemporaries:  she twice won Young Artist Awards and was nominated for the peer honor three other times.  Additional television credits include Finders Keepers, Hotel, Mr. Belvedere, ALF and The Wonder Years.

Schulman also starred in the 1989 films Troop Beverly Hills and Caddie Woodlawn. Her last acting appearance was on the television series Christy (with her Troop Beverly Hills co-star Kellie Martin), in which she played Ruby Mae Morrison.

Post-acting career
At 17, Schulman began a career shift away from the cameras. In 2008, after 13 years as the head of Acme Talent & Literary's Commercial Division, Schulman relocated her department to its current home at Talentworks. Schulman teaches acting in Connecticut.

Family
Schulman married Derek Webster in 2002; the couple have four children.

Filmography

References

External links

1977 births
Living people
American television actresses
American film actresses
American child actresses
Actresses from Los Angeles
20th-century American actresses
Acting teachers
21st-century American women